Don Williams (1939–2017) was an American country music singer.

Don Williams may also refer to:

Arts and entertainment
Don Williams (singer) (1922–2022), American singer, brother of Andy Williams
Don S. Williams (1938–2018), Canadian producer, director, actor, choreographer, and writer
Don Williams (animator) (born 1946/7), American illustrator, animator for Disney

Sports

Baseball
Don Williams (1958–1962 pitcher) (1931–2011), American baseball player for the Pittsburgh Pirates and Kansas City A's
Don Williams (1963 pitcher) (1935–1991), American baseball player for the Minnesota Twins
Don Williams (baseball scout) (born 1947), American baseball coach, manager, and scout

Other sports
Don Williams (offensive lineman) (1919–2001), American football player
Don Williams (American football coach) (1927–2013), American football and track and field coach
Don Williams (footballer, born 1935) (1935–1995), Australian rules footballer
Don Williams (footballer, born 1939), Australian rules footballer
Don Williams (poker player) (1942–2013), American poker player
Don Williams (racing driver) (1947–1989), American stock car driver
Don Williams (field hockey) (born 1966), British field hockey player

Others
Don Williams (Australian railway) (1937–2001), Australian railway engineer and planner
Donald E. Williams (1942–2016), astronaut
Donald E. Williams Jr. (born 1957), American politician from Connecticut
 Don Williams, composer and percussionist and brother of film composer, John Williams
 Don Williams, engineer who worked on the world's first communication satellites, Syncom

See also
Donald Williams (disambiguation)